Donald Patriquin (born October 21, 1938 in Sherbrooke, Quebec) is a Canadian composer, organist, and choral conductor. Known internationally for choral and instrumental arrangements of folk music, Patriquin was a member of the Faculty of Music of McGill University from 1965 to 1996. He currently resides in the Eastern Townships of Quebec.

Musical background
Patriquin began composing at the age of 11, winning several awards through his youth while studying composition with Jean Papineau-Couture during summer sessions. He completed a biology degree at Bishop's University in 1959 before beginning his formal studies in music. He studied composition at McGill University with István Anhalt and at the University of Toronto with John Weinzwig, earning a Bachelor of Music degree from McGill in 1964 and an M.A. from Toronto in 1970. He also holds an A.Mus. degree in organ performance from McGill and an RCCO

Music
Patriquin's compositions are best known for the use of folk music elements, and in his instrumental work for abstract noises imitating sounds of nature. This compositional style can be seen in such pieces as the Fantasy for Fiddle and the Hangman's Reel/Suite Carignan. Some of Patriquin's works include visual or other multimedia elements. Trois mois, composed in 1982, includes a diaporama, and Earthpeace II, a 1998 composition commemorating the victims of Chernobyl, is written for dancers and choir.

His music is published by Earthsongs, A Tempo, and Canadian International Music.

Discography
En la Fête de Noël - O Holy Night. Various artists, 1999. Naxos
Songs of Light. Jean Ashworth Bartle conductor, Ruth Watson Henderson piano, Toronto Children's Chorus. Marquis Classics, 253 (CD)

Works

Choral - a capella
Take, O Take Those Lips Away. 1962
The Greenwood Tree. 1963
A Lover and His Lass. 1965
Black is the Colour of My True Love's Hair, arr. 1968
Sortilege. 1979
Magnificat. 1983
Il est né le divin enfant, arr. 1989
Sixtyfold Amen. 1989
An Old Gaelic Blessing. 1990
Antiphon and the Child of Mary. 1992

Choral - with accompaniment
A Child's Carol. 1952 rev. 1992
Six Songs of Early Canada, arr. 1980 rev. 1992
Listen Sweet Dove. 1981
Six Noëls Anciens, arr. 1982
Songs of Innocence. 1984
Carol of the Fieldmice. 1985, rev. 1992
Chantons Noël. 1985 rev. 1992
Earthpeace Two. 1988
All Through the Night. arr. 1989
Introit. 1990
Prayer of Saint Francis. 1990
Requiem at Sea (The Titanic). 1992
'A Soalin', arr. 1992
On Christmas Day, arr. 1992
J'entends le Moulin, arr. 1992
Sister Mary Had One Child, arr. 1992
Un Canadien errant, arr. 1993
Overture to Christmas. 1993
The Five Seasons. 1997
World Music Suite. 1997
Mass for the Caribbean. 1998
Canadian Mosaic. 2000
Psalms & Canticles of Praise and Peace. 2003
Three love songs from the British Isles. 2007

Instrumental/Other
Fantasy for Fiddle. 1975
Hangman's Reel/Suite Carignan. 1978
Blanche de Percé (for narrator, guitar, flute and percussion). 1982 
Trois mois. 1982
Cycles (for soprano, piano and clarinet). 2004
Louisa's Story (musical with libretto by Sunil Mahtani). 2005

External links 
Donald Patriquin at The Encyclopedia of Music in Canada
Personal website

1938 births
Living people
20th-century classical composers
Canadian classical composers
Canadian people of Ulster-Scottish descent
Musicians from Sherbrooke
Canadian male classical composers
20th-century Canadian composers
20th-century Canadian male musicians